Darkoli (also Romanized as Dārkoli; also known as Darkoli (Persian: دارکولي), also Romanized as Dārkoli) is a village in Itivand-e Shomali Rural District, Kakavand District, Delfan County, Lorestan Province, Iran. At the 2006 census, its population was 30, in 4 families.

References 

Towns and villages in Delfan County